Pilar López de Ayala Arroyo (born 18 September 1978) is a Spanish actress.  She won a Goya Award for Best Actress for her performance playing Joanna of Castile in 2001 film Mad Love.

Family
Born in Madrid, López de Ayala has an older brother named Rodrigo López de Ayala Arroyo (b. 1975). Their parents are Rodrigo López de Ayala Sánchez-Arjona (b. Fregenal de la Sierra, 4 July 1944) and wife Pilar Arroyo Gallego.

Filmography

Film

Other 

 Yo, una mujer (2 episodes, "El adiós" and "#1.3", 1996) .... Arancha
 Menudo es mi padre (1 episode, "Un tranvía llamado deseo", 1996) ....
 Vida y sainete (1 episode, "El tiro por la culata", 1998) ....
 Al salir de clase (387 episodes, 1997–2001) .... Carlota Chacón
 El paraíso perdido (short film) (1999) ....
 Aviso de bomba (short film) (2000) .... Natalia
 Hospital Central (1 episode, "Relaciones dificiles", 2000) .... Mamen
 Vértigo (1 episode, "10 August 2000", 2000) .... Herself
 La gran ilusión (1 episode, "Más allá del jardín", 2001) .... Herself
 Lo + plus (1 episode, "27 September 2001", 2001) .... Herself
 XVI premios Goya (TV special) (2002) .... Herself - Winner: Best Lead Actress
 XI premios unión de actores (TV show) (2002) .... Herself
 XVIII premios Goya (TV special) (2004) .... Herself - Presenter: Best Lead Actor & Best Cinematography
 50 y más (2005) (TV) .... Juana la Loca archive footage
 Ceremonia de apertura (TV show) (2005) .... Herself
 Ceremonia de clausura (TV show) (2005) .... Herself archive footage
 Magacine (1 episode, "16 September 2005", 2005) .... archive footage
 XX premios Goya (TV special) (2006) .... Herself - Nominee: Best Supporting Actress & Presenter
 Versión española (2 episodes, "15 April 2005" and "#8.34", 2005–2006) .... Herself
 Corazón de... (4 episodes, "19 September 2005", "29 September 2005" (as Maestra archive footage (uncredited)), "16 January 2006", "20 March 2006" and "30 May 2006", 2005–2006) .... Herself
 San Sebastián 2005: Crónica de Carlos Boyero (TV movie) (2005) .... Maestra archive footage
 50 y más (TV movie) (2005) .... Juana la Loca archive footage
 La imagen de tu vida (1 episode, "...", 2006) .... archive footage
 La mandrágora (1 episode, "5 July 2006", 2006) .... Herself
 Hécuba, un sueño de pasión (Documentary) (2006) .... Herself (also archive footage)
 Cómo conseguir un papel en Hollywood (2007) (TV documentary) .... Herself archive footage
 Sexo en el plató (2007) (TV documentary) .... Juana la Loca archive footage
 XXII Premios Anuales de la Academia (2008) (TV special) .... Blanca Brisac Vázquez archive footage
 2008 Le grand journal de Canal+ (1 episode, "2 September 2008", 2008) .... Herself
 Cartelera (1 episode, "13 December 2008", 2008) .... Herself
 Ceremonia de inauguración - 57º festival internacional de cine de San Sebastián (TV movie) (2009) .... Herself
 Premio Donostia a Ian McKellen (TV movie) (2009) .... Herself - Audience Member
 Ceremonia de clausura - 57º festival internacional de cine de San Sebastián (TV movie) (2009) .... Herself - Presenter: Best Actress
 23 premios Goya (TV special) (2009) .... Paloma Molina archive footage (uncredited)
 España, plató de cine (TV documentary) (2009) .... Blanca Molina archive footage (uncredited)
 XXIV Premios Anuales de la Academia (TV movie) (2010) .... Herself
 Días de cine (1 episode, "20 May 2010", 2010) .... Herself
 Cinema 3 (1 episode, "22 May 2010", 2010) .... Herself
 Gala 20 aniversario (TV movie) (2010) .... Carlota Chacón archive footage

Awards and nominations
In 2001 she won the Best Actress award of the Toulouse Cinespanish for Báilame el agua (2000), was nominated for the Newcomer Award of the Actors and Actresses Union Awards for Besos para todos (2000), won the Sant Jordi Award for Best Spanish Actress (Mejor Actriz Española) for Báilame el agua (2000), won the Silver Seashell at the San Sebastián International Film Festival for Best Actress for Juana la Loca (2001) and was nominated for a Goya at the Goya Awards for Best New Actress (Mejor Actriz Revelación) for Besos para todos (2000).

In 2002 she won both the Newcomer Award and the Award to Best Film Leading Actress of the Actors and Actresses Union Awards, the Premio ACE at the Premios ACE for Cinema – Best Actress, the Goya at the Goya Awards for Best Lead Actress (Mejor Actriz Principal), the Fotogramas de Plata of the Fotogramas de Plata for Best Movie Actress (Mejor Actriz de Cine), the CEC Award of the Cinema Writers Circle Awards for Best Actress (Mejor Actriz) and the ADIRCAE Award at the ADIRCAE Awards for Best Performance in a Leading Role, all of them for Juana la Loca (2001).

In 2006 she was nominated for the Actors and Actresses Union Awards (Film actress, secondary performance), the Goya at the Goya Awards for Best Supporting Actress (Mejor Actriz de Reparto), the Fotogramas de Plata for Best Movie Actress (Mejor Actriz de Cine) and the CEC Award of the Cinema Writers Circle Awards for Best Supporting Actress (Mejor Actriz Secundaria), and won the Premio ACE at the Premios ACE for Cinema – Best Actress, all of them for Obaba (2005).

References

External links
 

Spanish film actresses
1978 births
Living people
Spanish untitled nobility
Goya Award winners
Actresses from Madrid
20th-century Spanish actresses
21st-century Spanish actresses